Christopher Meledandri (born May 15, 1959) is an American film producer and founder and CEO of Illumination. He previously served as President of 20th Century Animation, and has worked as the producer for the film series of Despicable Me, The Secret Life of Pets and Sing.

Early life
Meledandri was born in New York City to Roland Meledandri, a men's fashion designer, and Risha Meledandri, an activist, growing up in the Upper East Side of Manhattan. He attended Dartmouth College.

Career

Early career
Meledandri's first job in the film industry came when he worked as an assistant to executive producer Daniel Melnick on the set of Footloose. He co-founded the production company "The Meledandri/Gordon Company" (with Mark Gordon) until he left in 1991. Meledandri afterwards was the producer for a series of small films, before working as a producer for the 1993 Disney film Cool Runnings, which was a financial success. Soon after Meledandri was hired by 20th Century Fox, where executives presumed that the success of Cool Runnings showcased Meledandri's ability to produce financially successful family films. After a series of collaborations with filmmaker John Hughes, Meledandri was placed in charge of 20th Century Fox Animation. One of the first films released under Meledandri's tutelage was the animated science fiction film Titan A.E. (2000), a costly box office bomb whose failure almost caused him to be fired, and which caused Fox Animation Studios to be shut down.

1987–2007: Blue Sky Studios
In 1998, Meledandri led Fox's acquisition of fledgling visual effects house Blue Sky Studios, which became a commercially successful production studio. He oversaw the creative and business operations of Blue Sky, which became wholly owned by Fox. While at the studio, Meledandri supervised and/or executive produced films including Ice Age (2002), Robots (2005), Ice Age: The Meltdown (2006), Dr. Seuss Horton Hears a Who! (2008) and Ice Age: Dawn of the Dinosaurs (2009). He also produced two animated shorts, Gone Nutty (2002) and No Time for Nuts (2006), both were nominated for an Academy Award for Best Animated Short Film.

2007–present: Illumination
Meledandri left as President of 20th Century Fox Animation in early 2007, being replaced by Vanessa Morrison, and founded Illumination, an animated film production company that was co-owned by Universal Pictures, which fully financed and owned the films. Fox had attempted to retain Meledandri, but it was reported by the Los Angeles Times that Universal's offer of an ownership stake in Illumination had persuaded him to switch. Meledandri received a share of Illumination's box office earnings as part of his contract with Universal, and as of 2011, he also owned an undisclosed stake in the production company. In 2010, Illumination released its first film, Despicable Me, which became successful. Meledandri built a good relationship with chairman of NBCUniversal Stephen Burke, who liked Meledandri's propensity for producing animated films on a relatively low budget. Illumination released a film version of Dr. Seuss' The Lorax, which continued the successful collaboration between Meledandri and Theodor (Dr. Seuss) Geisel's widow, Audrey. He also produced the franchise spin-off prequel, Minions (2015) and the sequels to Despicable Me, Despicable Me 2 (2013) and Despicable Me 3 (2017).

2016–present: DreamWorks Animation and Nintendo
On April 28, 2016, NBCUniversal announced its intent to acquire competing studio DreamWorks Animation for $3.8 billion. It was announced that Meledandri would oversee both Illumination and DreamWorks following the completion of the merger. However, it was later announced that Meledandri had declined to oversee DreamWorks, and will instead be a consultant at the studio. On November 6, 2018, it was announced that Meledandri will be helping Universal and DreamWorks to revive the Shrek franchise. Meledandri intends, however, to retain the original voice actors, as he pointed out they were perhaps the most memorable parts of the series.

In January 2018, Nintendo announced during a fiscal meeting that Illumination would be developing an animated Mario film and that Meledandri will co-produce the film with Super Mario creator Shigeru Miyamoto. On July 5, 2021, it was reported that Meledandri would join Nintendo's board of directors "as an independent and non-executive outside director", in order to help Nintendo through their filmmaking experience as the company moves towards developing films after Illumination's The Super Mario Bros. Movie.

Personal life
Meledandri is a member of The Academy of Motion Picture Arts and Sciences, and is a member of the board of trustees at The Hotchkiss School in Lakeville, Connecticut. He has two sons, born c. 1990 and 1998.

Filmography

Films

References

External links

1959 births
20th-century American businesspeople
21st-century American businesspeople
Businesspeople from New York City
Film producers from New York (state)
American animated film producers
Blue Sky Studios people
Hotchkiss School alumni
Dartmouth College alumni
American chief executives
Living people
Illumination (company) people
American mass media company founders